The Alby-Yerdy are the ruins of the medieval temple in Ingushetia, located on the left bank of the Assa River. As a result of a radiocarbon study, scientists date the architectural monument to 668-974. Following the opinion of most researchers, the temple is recognized as a Christian church, although numerous remains of sacrificial animals were found inside the church, indicating rituals of ancient Ingush religion.

See also
 Tkhaba-Yerdy

Weblinks 
Открытый Кавказ (virtual tour)

History of Ingushetia
Churches in Ingushetia
Medieval Eastern Orthodox church buildings in Russia